Kenneth Gill (born 2 April 1948) is an English former professional rugby league footballer who played in the 1970s and 1980s.

Playing career

International honours
Ken Gill won caps for England while at Salford in 1975 against Wales, in the 1975 Rugby League World Cup against France, Wales (sub), New Zealand (scoring a hat-trick of tries), Australia (sub), Wales, France, New Zealand, Australia, and Australia,  and in 1977 against Wales, and France, and won caps for Great Britain while at Salford in 1974 against France (2 matches), Australia (2 matches), and New Zealand, and in the 1977 Rugby League World Cup against France (sub), and Australia (sub).

Championship appearances
Ken Gill played in Widnes' victory in the Championship during the 1977–78 season.

County Cup Final appearances
Ken Gill played  in Salford's 25-11 victory over Swinton in the 1972 Lancashire County Cup Final during the 1972–73 season at Wilderspool Stadium, Warrington on Saturday 21 October 1972, played  in the 9-19 defeat by Wigan in the 1973 Lancashire County Cup Final during the 1973–74 season at Wilderspool Stadium, Warrington on Saturday 13 October 1973, and played  in the 7-16 defeat by Widnes in the 1975 Lancashire County Cup Final during the 1975–76 season at Central Park, Wigan on Saturday 4 October 1975.

BBC2 Floodlit Trophy Final appearances
Ken Gill did not play (Tom Brophy played ) in Salford's 0-0 draw with Warrington in the 1974 BBC2 Floodlit Trophy Final during the 1974–75 season at The Willows, Salford on Tuesday 17 December 1974, and played  in the 10-5 victory over Warrington in the 1974 BBC2 Floodlit Trophy Final replay during the 1974–75 season at Wilderspool Stadium, Warrington on Tuesday 28 January 1975.

Player's No.6 Trophy Final appearances
Ken Gill played  (replaced by interchange/substitute P. Ward) in Salford's 7-12 defeat by Leeds in the 1972–73 Player's No.6 Trophy Final during the 1972–73 season at Fartown Ground, Huddersfield on Saturday 24 March 1973.

References

External links
Statistics at rugby.widnes.tv

1948 births
Living people
Barrow Raiders players
England national rugby league team players
English rugby league players
Great Britain national rugby league team players
Lancashire rugby league team players
Rugby league five-eighths
Rugby league players from St Helens, Merseyside
Salford Red Devils players
Widnes Vikings players